Taşbaşı can refer to:

 Taşbaşı, Alanya
 Taşbaşı, İspir